Totally Personal is a 2005 Bosnian documentary film directed by Nedžad Begović. It was selected as the Bosnian entry for the Best Foreign Language Film at the 78th Academy Awards, but it was not nominated.

Cast
 Naida Begović as Self
 Nedžad Begović as Self
 Sabrina Begović-Ćorić as Self

See also
 List of submissions to the 78th Academy Awards for Best Foreign Language Film
 List of Bosnian submissions for the Academy Award for Best International Feature Film

References

External links
 

2005 films
2005 documentary films
Bosnia and Herzegovina documentary films
Serbo-Croatian-language films